Adrianus Gerardus (Gerard) Schouw (born 30 December 1965 in Monster, South Holland) is a Dutch corporate director and former politician. As a member of Democrats 66 (D66) he was an MP from 17 June 2010 till 31 July 2015. He focused on matters of the European Union, democracy, judiciary and the right of asylum. He has been replaced by Fatma Koşer Kaya. Since 1 August 2015 he has been CEO of Nefarma.

Biography 
Schouw studied administration of business at Hogeschool Delft, public administration at VU University Amsterdam and obtained a Ph.D. in law from Leiden University.

From 1990 to 1998 he was a member of the municipal council of Dordrecht and from 1994 to 1998 an alderman of Dordrecht. From 1999 to 2002 he was D66 chairman. From 2003 to 2010 he was a member of the Senate as well as from 2007 to 2010 Senate group leader. From June 2010 till July 2015 he was a member of the House of Representatives. In 2012, he was a candidate to become Speaker of the House of Representatives. He competed against Anouchka van Miltenburg and Khadija Arib, with Van Miltenburg winning the election.

Besides his political activities Schouw was director of the Dutch knowledge centre for big cities (Kenniscentrum Grote Steden) from 2001 to 2007. Since 2007 he has been president of the board of directors of the Netherlands Institute for City Innovation Studies (Nicis Institute).

Since August 2015 he has been CEO of Nefarma, the trade association for those pharmaceutical industries in the Netherlands, which develop innovative pharmaceutical drugs.

References 
  Parlement.com biography

External links 

  House of Representatives biography

1965 births
Living people
20th-century Dutch politicians
21st-century Dutch politicians
Aldermen of Dordrecht
Chairmen of the Democrats 66
Democrats 66 politicians
Dutch jurists
Dutch public administration scholars
Leiden University alumni
Members of the House of Representatives (Netherlands)
Members of the Senate (Netherlands)
Municipal councillors of Dordrecht
People from Monster
Vrije Universiteit Amsterdam alumni